Mubark Al-Beloushi (born March 22, 1986, in Doha) is a retired Qatari footballer who played as a defensive midfielder. He was a member of the Qatar national football team.

References

External links
 
 

Qatari footballers
Living people
1984 births
Qatar international footballers
Al-Rayyan SC players
Al-Sailiya SC players
Al Ahli SC (Doha) players
Qatar SC players
Umm Salal SC players
Al-Shamal SC players
Al-Shahania SC players
Qatar Stars League players
Qatari Second Division players
Association football midfielders